Osman Durmuş (5 August 1947 – 26 October 2020) was a Turkish physician and politician.

Career
He was a member of parliament for the Nationalist Movement Party (MHP) from 1999 to 2002, serving as the Minister of Health. He was on the faculty of Gazi University, becoming associate professor in 1990 and full professor in 2003, after the MHP failed to reach the 10% threshold in the 2002 elections. He was elected again in 2007, representing the Kırıkkale electoral district.

Death
Durmuş died in Ankara following a brain hemorrhage on 26 October 2020. He was buried at Karşıyaka Cemetery the following day, after a state funeral was held.

References

1947 births
2020 deaths
People from Çankırı
Ankara University alumni
Academic staff of Gazi University
20th-century Turkish physicians
Nationalist Movement Party politicians
Health ministers of Turkey
Members of the 23rd Parliament of Turkey
Members of the 21st Parliament of Turkey
Burials at Karşıyaka Cemetery, Ankara